The Cox site (15WD107) is a Middle Fort Ancient culture (1200 to 1400 CE) archaeological site located in Woodford County, Kentucky, in the Bluegrass region of the state.

Not enough investigations at the site have happened for archaeologists to be able to determine the pattern, shape or layout of the proposed village site. The finding of shell tempered pottery and distinctive triangular-shaped arrowheads along with radiocarbon dates has allowed researchers to date the site. Two burials have been located at the site; however, one was a flexed burial found by the owner of the site and the other was an extended burial found by archaeologists during investigations.

See also
 Muir site
 Thompson site

References

 

Fort Ancient culture
Archaeological sites in Kentucky
Woodford County, Kentucky